Jack Levin may refer to:

 Jack Levin (sociologist), sociologist and criminologist
 Jack Levin (producer) (1914–1999), American TV producer